RASU or Rasu may refer to:

 Joshua Rasu, a Vanuatuan cricketer
 Monte Rasu, a mountain in Sardinia, Italy
 Perumal Rasu, an Indian poet
 Rangoon Arts and Sciences University, former name of University of Yangon, Myanmar
 Rasu Jilani
 Rasu Kami, a village in the Indian state of Tripura
 Rasu Madhuravan, a Tamil film director